Guangxiao Temple may refer to:

 Guangxiao Temple (Guangzhou), in Guangzhou, Guangdong, China
 Guangxiao Temple (Putian), in Putian, Fujian, China

Buddhist temple disambiguation pages